Paphiopedilum mastersianum is a species of orchid occurring from the Lesser Sunda Islands to Maluku.

mastersianum